Pinckneyville is a historic frontier settlement site located near Union, Union County, South Carolina.  Pinckneyville was established on February 19, 1791,  by the General Assembly of South Carolina Act #1491 along with the Washington district, and is one of the earliest settlements in the South Carolina backcountry.
  
The property includes the original site of Pinckneyville and contains the ruins of the brick structure mistakenly referred to as the jail and one other brick building, usually referred to as the old store.

It was added to the National Register of Historic Places in 1969.

References

External links
Historic Courthouse at Pinckneyville - Union County, S.C.

Archaeological sites on the National Register of Historic Places in South Carolina
1790 establishments in South Carolina
Buildings and structures in Union County, South Carolina
National Register of Historic Places in Union County, South Carolina